Motorcade of Generosity is the debut studio album by American alternative rock band Cake. It was recorded at the Pus Cavern studio in Sacramento, California, and released through Capricorn Records on February 7, 1994.

According to Pitchfork reviewer Madison Bloom, Motorcade of Geneoristy is a lo-fi album with "warm and close" songs that pull from different musical styles, such as honky-tonk and ranchera, and compared its style to "trailing notes down a stairwell into some subterranean tavern, where a cantina band plays over clinking pints." Music critic Daryl Cater deemed it an example of funky, guitar-oriented "quirk-rock" reminiscent of Phish's "genre-hopping jams".

Release
On January 14, 2009, a limited edition orange vinyl re-issue of the album was made available for purchase on the band's official website. It sold out in two days.

Reception

The album has received a mixed-to-favorable response from critics. AllMusic critic Darryl Cater stated that "Cake's minimalist jams occasionally get repetitive", though he concluded that "there are enough standouts here to easily qualify Motorcade as a keeper." Music reviewer Robert Christgau described the album as "unambiguity from the near side of cool."

Legacy
In 2005, the song "I Bombed Korea" was translated into Hebrew and performed by Zeev Tene under the title "Beirut", with "Korea" replaced by "Lebanon" in the lyrics. This version was included on the soundtrack of the film Waltz with Bashir (2008).

Track listing

Personnel 

 Cake

 John McCrea – vocals, guitar
 Greg Brown – guitar, organ
 Vince DiFiore – trumpet
 Victor Damiani – bass
 Todd Roper – drums

 Additional personnel

 Frank French – drums on tracks 5, 8, 10, 11
 Gabriel Nelson – bass on tracks 5, 8, 10, 11
 Hag – extra background vocals

References

External links 

 

1994 debut albums
Cake (band) albums
Capricorn Records albums
Lo-fi music albums